

Gerhard Franz (26 February 1902 – 24 December 1975) was a German general in the Wehrmacht during World War II.  He was a recipient of the Knight's Cross of the Iron Cross of Nazi Germany.

Awards and decorations

 Knight's Cross of the Iron Cross on 24 July 1941 as Oberstleutnant i.G. and Ia der 29. Infanterie-Division

Notes

References

 

1902 births
1975 deaths
People from Saale-Holzland-Kreis
People from Saxe-Altenburg
Major generals of the German Army (Wehrmacht)
Recipients of the Gold German Cross
Recipients of the Knight's Cross of the Iron Cross
German prisoners of war in World War II held by the United States
Military personnel from Thuringia